The Tyler East Texans were a minor league baseball team that played in the Big State League from 1951 to 1953. It was based in the United States city of Tyler, Texas.

Under manager Bill Capps in 1952, the team won the league championship. It reached the league finals in 1953, but lost the series.

Major league players
Numerous players with major league experience played for the club.

1951
Merv Connors
Hal Epps
Joe Kracher (also managed the club)
Tony Ordenana
Bill Reeder

1952
Hal Epps
Red Murff

1953
Jim Kirby
Hank Wyse

References

Sports in Tyler, Texas
Defunct Big State League teams
Defunct minor league baseball teams
Defunct baseball teams in Texas
Professional baseball teams in Texas
Baseball teams established in 1951
Sports clubs disestablished in 1953
1951 establishments in Texas
1953 disestablishments in Texas
Baseball teams disestablished in 1953